Ungheni County was a county of Moldova from 1998 to 2003. Its population in 2003 was 260,300. Its capital was Ungheni.

It was bordered by the Moldovan counties of Bălți, Orhei, Chişinău, and Lăpușna, and with Romania to the west.

See also
Moldavian counties

External links
 Counties of Moldova, Statoids.com

Counties of Moldova
Counties of Bessarabia
1998 establishments in Moldova
2003 disestablishments in Moldova
States and territories established in 1998
States and territories disestablished in 2003